The Roman Catholic  Diocese of Parral is a suffragan diocese of the Archdiocese of Chihuahua, in Mexico. It was erected in 1992.

Ordinaries
José Andrés Corral Arredondo (1992 – 2011)
Eduardo Cirilo Carmona Ortega, C.O.R.C. (2012 – 2019), appointed Coadjutor Bishop of Córdoba, Veracruz

Episcopal See
Parral, Chihuahua

External links and references

Parral
Parral, Roman Catholic Diocese of